Alonso de Tenza Pacheco, Lord of Espinardo, (in full), was a Spanish nobleman.

Alonso de Tenza was Lord (owner) of the towns of Espinardo, Ontur, Albatana and Mojón Blanco. He married Doña Aldonza de Cascales y Soto, a distant relative of Hernando de Soto and had a daughter Luisa, who married Admiral Don Luis Fajardo.

Sources

Alonso
16th-century Spanish people
Year of birth unknown
Year of death unknown